Tapacocha District is one of ten districts of the Recuay Province in Peru.

See also 
 Kiswar
 Kushuru Hirka
 T'uquyuq

References

Districts of the Recuay Province
Districts of the Ancash Region